The 2014 Nordic Futsal Championship, was the fourth edition of the Nordic Futsal Championship hosted by Tampere, Finland.

Final standings

Matches and results

Awards

 Winner:  Vegakameratene
 Runners-up:  Ilves
 Third-Place:  Golden Futsal Team
 Top scorer:
 Best Player:

References

External links
 Futsal Planet

2016
2014–15 in European futsal
2014
2014 in Finnish football
Sports competitions in Tampere